Frank Elbert Midkiff (November 15, 1887 – August 7, 1983) was an American educator and civic leader. He served as High Commissioner of the Trust Territory of the Pacific Islands from March 13, 1953 to September 1, 1954.

Life and career

Midkiff was born in Anna, Illinois. He served as principal of Lewistown High School in Lewistown, Illinois from 1908 to 1910. He then worked at the Kimberly Gold Mines, Jardine, Montana before taking a position as instructor of English and coach for baseball and football at Peddie Institute, Hightstown, New Jersey. Midkiff graduated from Colgate University in 1912. He went on to teach English and head the athletics at Oahu College in 1913. He served in the United States Army during World War I from 1918 to 1919. After his honorable discharge, he joined the firm of Lewers & Cooke, Ltd. He served as President of Kamehameha Schools from 1923 to 1934.

He earned his Ph.D. in Education from Yale University in 1935.  He served as Acting President, Honolulu Chamber of Commerce. He was appointed by President Dwight D. Eisenhower to the position of High Commissioner of the Trust Territory of the Pacific Islands.

Midkiff died in Honolulu, Hawai'i on August 7, 1983. The Frank E. Midkiff Learning Center at Kamehameha Schools was named in his honor in 1977.

References

External links
Frank E. Midkiff, Ph.D. via Kamehameha Schools Archive
Frank E. Midkiff Learning Center

1887 births
1983 deaths
20th-century American educators
High Commissioners of the Trust Territory of the Pacific Islands
Colgate University alumni
Yale University alumni
People from Anna, Illinois
United States Army personnel of World War I
Educators from New York (state)
Educators from Illinois